Gumare Airport , also known as Gomare Airport, is an airport serving Gumare, a village in Botswana.

See also

Transport in Botswana
List of airports in Botswana

References

External links
OpenStreetMap - Gumare
OurAirports - Gumare
Fallingrain - Gumare Airport
Bing Maps - Gumare

Airports in Botswana